Simon Janssen (born 25 September 2000) is a Dutch professional footballer who plays as a left-back for Eerste Divisie club VVV-Venlo.

Career
Janssen progressed through the VVV-Venlo youth academy after arriving there from the SV Blerick in 2010. He made his professional debut for the club on his 18th birthday on 25 September 2018 in a 3–0 away win in the KNVB Cup over Westlandia, replacing Tino-Sven Sušić in the 73rd minute. He made his Eredivisie debut three months later in a 4–1 loss to Feyenoord on 6 December 2018, coming off the bench for Evert Linthorst.

On 18 April 2019, Janssen signed a two-year contract with VVV, with an option for an additional year.

VVV exercised the option in Janssen's contract in March 2021, keeping him in Venlo until 2022. On 7 December 2021, he signed a two-year contract extension until 2024, with a unilateral option to extend for a further year. At that point Janssen, originally a midfielder, was converted to play left-back by head coach Jos Luhukay.

Career statistics

References

External links
 

Living people
2000 births
Dutch footballers
Footballers from Venlo
VVV-Venlo players
Eredivisie players
Eerste Divisie players
Association football fullbacks